Ineta Kravale (born 20 April 1959) is a Latvian cross-country skier. She competed in three events at the 1994 Winter Olympics.

References

External links
 

1959 births
Living people
Latvian female cross-country skiers
Olympic cross-country skiers of Latvia
Cross-country skiers at the 1994 Winter Olympics
People from Pļaviņas
20th-century Latvian women